Ross Sydney Hook  (19 February 1917 – 26 June 1996) was an Anglican bishop in the 20th century.

Educated at Christ's Hospital and Peterhouse, Cambridge, he was made a deacon on Trinity Sunday 1941 (8 June) by Cyril Garbett, Bishop of Winchester, and ordained a priest the following Trinity Sunday (31 May 1942) by Mervyn Haigh, Bishop of Winchester — both times at Winchester Cathedral. After Second World War service in the RNVR he was appointed Chaplain of Ridley Hall, Cambridge. From here he rose rapidly in the Church hierarchy being successively Vicar of  Chorlton-cum-Hardy, Rural Dean of Chelsea and a Canon Residentiary at Rochester Cathedral before being ordained to the episcopate as Bishop of Grantham in 1965. He was consecrated a bishop on 30 November 1965 by Michael Ramsey, Archbishop of Canterbury, at Westminster Abbey. He was translated to become Bishop of Bradford seven years later. Following his time Bradford, he served at Lambeth Palace (under Robert Runcie) as Chief of Staff to the Archbishop of Canterbury (1980–1984).

References

1917 births
People educated at Christ's Hospital
Alumni of Peterhouse, Cambridge
Royal Naval Volunteer Reserve personnel of World War II
Bishops of Grantham
Bishops of Bradford (diocese)
1996 deaths
Recipients of the Military Cross
Royal Navy chaplains
World War II chaplains
20th-century Church of England bishops